The United States House of Representatives elections in California, 1924 was an election for California's delegation to the United States House of Representatives, which occurred as part of the general election of the House of Representatives on November 4, 1924. California's delegation remained unchanged at 9 Republicans and 2 Democrats.

Overview

Results
Final results from the Clerk of the House of Representatives:

District 1

District 2

District 3

District 4

District 5

District 6

District 7

District 8

District 9

District 10

District 11

See also 
69th United States Congress
Political party strength in California
Political party strength in U.S. states
1924 United States House of Representatives elections

References 
California Elections Page
Office of the Clerk of the House of Representatives

External links 
California Legislative District Maps (1911-Present)
RAND California Election Returns: District Definitions

1924 California elections
1924
California United States House of Representatives